The culture of Oman describe the cultural aspects of people living in Oman, which is steeped in the religion of Islam. Oman has its own unique subsect of Islam, known as Ibadhism, however other strands of Islam such as Sunni and Shi'a are also practised. The Islamic month of fasting, Ramadan, and other Islamic festivities are very important events in the Omani culture.

Dress

For men, the national dress is an ankle-length, collarless gown with long sleeves, called a dishdasha. Most of the time, the clothing is white, although a few other colors such as brown, lilac, and black are sometimes worn. There are many accessories men can wear, for example, the muzzar (a type of turban), the assa (a cane or stick used mainly for formal occasions), and the khanjar. The khanjar is a ceremonial curved dagger worn during formal occasions, often described as "an important symbol of male elegance".

The national dress for Omani women includes a dress worn over trousers (sirwal) and a headdress (lihaf). Usually, the materials used are of very colorful, vibrant colors. Traditionally, Omani women would wear a kind of wooden platform shoe, but nowadays, most prefer to wear sandals. The cut of the clothing differs in various regions, as do color, embroidery, and materials. Women complete their outfit with gold jewelry and cosmetics, opting for either brand-name or traditionally-made items. When in public, most women in cities wear the abaya, a modest black dress or cloak worn over the clothes, and the hijab, the typical Muslim hair covering.

Dhow

With a culture mainly oriented to the sea, an important symbol in Oman is the dhow. These sailing ships have been used for centuries along the Arabian Peninsula, India, and East Africa for the purpose of trade. In fact, the earliest reported use of an Omani dhow was in the 8th century, arriving in China. In modern-day use, the dhows operate for the purpose of trade, tourism, and fishing, and they can be seen all along Oman's coastline.

Cuisine

The cuisine of Oman uses spices and marinades to complete a dish, which usually consists of chicken, fish, and lamb. Unlike that of many other Asian nations, Omani cuisine is not spicy, and varies regionally. Everyday meals generally have components such as rice, a wide variety of soups, salad, curry, and fresh vegetables. For dessert, a known Omani sweet Omani halwa is usually served. This is usually served before the consumption of kahwa, a preparation of coffee with cardamom, which is very popular and remains a symbol of hospitality. Other popular beverages include tea, laban (a kind of salty buttermilk), yoghurt drinks, and soft drinks like mountain dew.

For festive occasions, special dishes are prepared, particularly for Islamic tradition. The range of dishes is very diverse, and there are certain meals only prepared during Ramadan.

See also

 Islam in Oman
 List of museums in Oman
 Music of Oman
 Cinema of Oman
 Women in Oman
 Culture of Eastern Arabia

References

Roche, T. & Roche, E. (2012). Interwoven: Women's dress practices and identity on the Arabian Peninsula. International Journal of Interdisciplinary Social Sciences, 6(10), pp. 133–144.

Roche, T., Roche, E. & Al-Saidi, A. (2014). The dialogic fashioning of women's dress in the Sultanate of Oman. Journal of Arabian studies: Arabia, the Gulf, and the Red Sea. 4.1(June) pp. 38–51. https://dx.doi.org/10.1080/21534764.2014.918373

 
Oman